Marie-Galante Airport  is an airport serving the island of Marie-Galante in Guadeloupe.

The Marie Galante non-directional beacon (Ident: MG) is located on the field.

See also

Transport in Guadeloupe
List of airports in Guadeloupe

References

External links
 
OpenStreetMap - Marie-Galante
SkyVector - Marie-Galante
OurAirports - Marie-Galante

Airports in the dependencies of Guadeloupe
Airport